Yan Zihao (born 18 January 1995) is a Chinese footballer who currently plays as a left-back or left winger for Chinese Super League side Cangzhou Mighty Lions.

Club career
Yan Zihao was selected to go to football training camps held in Portugal to help in his youth development, in a scheme that was sponsored by the Chinese Football Association. His time in Portugal would see him join the senior team teams of lower league sides Cova da Piedade and Torreense. On 1 February 2016, Yan would return to China with second tier football club Tianjin Quanjian for the start of the 2016 China League One season. He would make his debut on 8 May 2016 in a league game against Qingdao Jonoon in a 3-2 victory where he came on as a substitute for Wang Jie. After the game he would start to become a regular within the team and help them win the division title and promotion to the top tier. The following season saw the club bring in experienced left-back Mi Haolun, which saw Yan lose his place within the team and he was loaned out to third tier club Jiangsu Yancheng in the 2018 league season.

Career statistics

Honours

Club
Tianjin Quanjian F.C.
China League One: 2016

References

External links
 

1995 births
Living people
Chinese footballers
Chinese expatriate footballers
China youth international footballers
Association football defenders
Campeonato de Portugal (league) players
China League One players
Chinese Super League players
China League Two players
U.D. Oliveirense players
Sporting CP footballers
C.D. Cova da Piedade players
S.C.U. Torreense players
Tianjin Tianhai F.C. players
Qingdao F.C. players
Chinese expatriate sportspeople in Portugal
Expatriate footballers in Portugal